Diego Alejandro Restrepo Garcia (born February 25, 1988) is a Colombian-American football coach and former football player who played as a goalkeeper. Currently, he is the Head of Goalkeeping for D.C. United, a Major League Soccer franchise.

Playing career

College and amateur
Restrepo lived in Colombia until he was 11 before moving to West Palm Beach, Florida with his family. He attended American Heritage School, and spent time at the IMG Soccer Academy in Bradenton, Florida, before going on to play three years of college soccer at the University of South Florida. He transferred to the University of Virginia prior to his junior year, and quickly installed himself as the team's starting goalkeeper for Virginia, with whom he won the ACC Championship and the NCAA National Championship in 2009.

During his championship season, Restrepo broke school records previously held by Tony Meola for games played (25), minutes played (2348), shutouts (16), consecutive shutouts (11) and consecutive scoreless minutes (1176). He was named the Most Valuable Player (MVP) of the ACC Tournament and Defensive Most Valuable Player of the NCAA Tournament.

During his college years Restrepo also played for the Bradenton Academics in the USL Premier Development League.

Professional
In January 2011, Restrepo signed a professional contract with Colombian soccer club América de Cali. He made his professional debut on Wednesday, August 31, 2011, in America's 1-1 tie vs. Pereira.

Restrepo moved to Venezuelan club Deportivo Táchira on December 30, 2011. He played 8 competitive matches for Tachira, 4 in the Venezuelan Cup, and 4 in the Venezuelan First Division. He finished the season as Tachira's starter.

On March 20, 2013 the Tampa Bay Rowdies announced that Restrepo had signed a two-year contract with the club. He excelled after being named the Rowdies starting goalkeeper, playing in 26 matches in all competitions. He was named the "NASL Player Of The Week" 3 times and to the "NASL Team Of the Week" 7 times in 2013.

During the Rowdies' 2014 preseason training, Restrepo tore his Achilles tendon and was sidelined for the entirety of the 2014 season. On November 6, Restrepo announced he would be moving on from Tampa Bay.

Restrepo signed with USL club Charlotte Independence on February 24, 2015. During his short stay with Charlotte, he played in 3 matches, 2 in the U.S. Open Cup and 1 in USL league play.

In June 2015, Restrepo is transferred to Metropolitanos FC, returning to the Venezuelan First Division. On August 1, 2015, Restrepo takes over the starting role at Metropolitanos, helping the team snap a 3-game losing streak. Restrepo stays as Metropolitanos starting goalkeeper, making 16 starts in all competitions, including 12 league starts.

Restrepo joined NASL side Fort Lauderdale Strikers on December 31, 2015. He helped the Strikers earn their first win of the season, on the road in his club debut on May 7, 2016, 3-1 vs. the league leading Carolina Railhawks. The following week, he cemented his starting role with his first shutout of the season, in a 0-0 draw vs. the Indy Eleven. With Restrepo in goal, the Strikers improved from 9th place in the league standings, to 1 point away from the Spring Season title. Restrepo helped the Strikers reach the final 8 of the 2016 US Open Cup, and for his heroics is named lower division player of the tournament.

Due to the dire financial situation of the Strikers, Restrepo was transferred briefly back to the Tampa Bay Rowdies to finish the 2016 North American Soccer League season. He served as the backup goalkeeper for the last month of the Rowdies season.

On March 9, 2017, San Antonio FC of the USL announces the signing of Restrepo for the 2017 season. After week 5, when starting keeper Matt Cardone was lost for the season due to injury, Restrepo establishes himself as SAFC's starter and goes on to have a record breaking season, leading the club to the best collective defensive performance in the league, recording just four losses and conceding 24 goals (21 individually). Restrepo led the USL with 12 clean sheets, recording 69 saves, posting a 76.7 percent save success rate, and finishing as runner-up in the race for the USL Golden Glove with a 0.80 goals against average. For his performance, Restrepo was named the 2017 United Soccer League Goalkeeper Of The Year, and to the 2017 United Soccer League Best Eleven.

In 2018 Restrepo lost his starting role due to injury, and he signed with Austin Bold FC on 17 January 2019.

U.S. Open Cup

Restrepo has had much success in the Lamar Hunt U.S. Open Cup throughout his career. In 2013, he helped the Tampa Bay Rowdies knock out Seattle Sounders FC, saving an Obafemi Martins penalty kick in the 84th minute to preserve the 1-0 result. In 2015, Restrepo helped the Charlotte Independence attain their first win versus a higher division opponent, coming on in the 40th minute to preserve the shutout and 1-0 victory versus the NASL's Carolina Railhawks.

In 2016, Restrepo was the star of the Fort Lauderdale Strikers run to the Open Cup's final 8. He tallied a shutout and stopped 3 penalty kicks during the shootout win vs. the Richmond Kickers, earning U.S. Open Cup player of the round. In the round of 36, he held D.C. United scoreless during 120 minutes of play, and stopped a penalty kick during the shootout, helping the Strikers advance to the round of 16. Restrepo was also a key performer in the Strikers 2-1 win vs. Orlando City SC making several vital saves in the match, and earning a reputation as an "MLS killer" in the tournament. For his impressive performances in the 2016 Tournament, Restrepo was the "U.S. Open Cup Lower Division Player of the Tournament".

International
Despite being born in Venezuela, Restrepo has represented the United States at the youth level. He is a graduate of the USA U-17 Residency Program. In 2005, he was a member of the USA U-17 World Cup squad that participated in the 2005 Youth World Cup in Peru. He has also been a member of the USA U-20 National Team.

Honors

University of Virginia
NCAA Men's Division I Soccer Championship (1): 2009

América de Cali
Copa Cafam (1): 2011

San Antonio FC
2017 USL Goalkeeper Of The Year
2017 USL Best Eleven

References

External links
 University of Virginia Bio
 

1988 births
Living people
Venezuelan footballers
American soccer players
Colombian footballers
South Florida Bulls men's soccer players
Virginia Cavaliers men's soccer players
IMG Academy Bradenton players
América de Cali footballers
Deportivo Táchira F.C. players
Tampa Bay Rowdies players
Charlotte Independence players
Metropolitanos FC players
Fort Lauderdale Strikers players
San Antonio FC players
Austin Bold FC players
Categoría Primera A players
USL League Two players
North American Soccer League players
USL Championship players
United States men's youth international soccer players
United States men's under-20 international soccer players
Colombian emigrants to the United States
American sportspeople of Colombian descent
Association football goalkeepers
NCAA Division I Men's Soccer Tournament Most Outstanding Player winners
People from Mérida, Mérida
D.C. United non-playing staff